Argyrodes scapulatus is a species of spiders of the family Theridiidae that is endemic in Cape Verde. The species was named and first described in 1994.

References

Theridiidae
Spiders of Africa
Spiders described in 1994
Taxa named by Günter E. W. Schmidt
Taxa named by Friedhelm Piepho
Arthropods of Cape Verde
Endemic fauna of Cape Verde